Hydro Extruded Solutions is a manufacturer of extruded aluminium profiles. Norsk Hydro announced in July 2017 that it would take full ownership of the 50/50 joint venture Sapa AS by buying the remaining 50 percent stake from conglomerate Orkla Group. The transaction was completed and Sapa was brought into Hydro ASA on October 2, 2017. According to Bloomberg, Sapa "falsified thousands of certifications for aluminum parts over 19 years for hundreds of customers, including NASA." In Extruded Solutions, Hydro has the largest global aluminium extrusion-based operation in the world, counting 100 production sites in more than 40 countries, and has 22,400 employees. Hydro's head office is located in Oslo, Norway.

History 
Skandinaviska Aluminiumprofiler AB (Scandinavian Aluminum Profiles) set up its first extrusion plant in Vetlanda in 1963, with sales of aluminum profiles from the Swedish plant beginning in 1967. The Norwegian corporation Orkla Group acquired Sapa in 2005 and delisted the company from the Stockholm Stock Exchange.

Sapa and Alcoa engaged in a joint venture in 2007, making it one of the world's largest extrusion companies. One year later, in December 2008, Alcoa and Orkla executed an asset swap transaction. In this transaction, Orkla took over Alcoa's soft aluminium alloy extrusion business, which was then organized under the Sapa name, and became the sole owner of Sapa

In 2009 the company acquired  10 North American extrusion plants that belonged to Indalex. At the time of the purchase, Indalex was under bankruptcy protection. The acquisition covered six plants in the United States and four in Canada.

In October 2012, Orkla and the Norwegian company Norsk Hydro announced that they had agreed to combine the aluminium extrusion businesses of Sapa and Hydro into a new 50/50 joint venture, which would keep the Sapa name. After having received approvals from all relevant authorities, the joint venture transaction was closed and a new company, Sapa AS, was established on September 1, 2013. Hydro ASA acquired Sapa in October 2017, when Sapa was renamed Hydro Extruded Solutions and organized as a new business area.

In 2019 a NASA investigation of two Taurus rocket launch failures, which resulted in the loss of 700 million dollars worth of payload, determined that the root cause was the use of defective parts manufactured and fraudulently certified by Sapa Profiles, Inc. (SPI).

Organization 
Internally, Hydro Extruded Solutions has four business units. Two of them, organized geographically, are within Extrusions. The other two are Precision Tubing and Building Systems. In fact, one of the aluminium building systems brands has retained the former company name, Sapa. In total, Hydro Extruded Solutions operates some 100 production sites in more than 40 countries. The business area has about 22,400 employees across the world.

Extrusions 
Extrusions is a producer of extruded aluminium profiles. Sites also handle cutting, bending, CNC processing, hydroforming, fusion welding, friction stir welding, electromagnetic pulse forming, electromagnetic pulse welding anodizing and painting. Extrusions is organized internally with two business units, covering North America and Europe. Its extrusion activities in Asia and South America are organized within the Precision Tubing unit.

Building Systems 
Building Systems develops and sells aluminium-based window, door and facade products. This includes the development of energy-saving concepts. The business unit has a portfolio of global brands – Sapa, Technal and Wicona – as well as various regional brands.

Precision Tubing 
Precision Tubing develops and markets aluminium tubing and tubing primarily for heat transfer applications in the automotive industry and in the heating, ventilation, air conditioning and refrigeration industry. The business unit also is responsible for Hydro's general extrusion operations in Asia and South America.

Sustainability 
Hydro's move toward a circular economy involves an emphasis on recycling aluminium. Aluminium can be recycled and reused over and over without any reduction in quality, consuming only 5 percent of the energy that was required in the primary aluminium production.

In 2017, more than half of the aluminium used in Hydro Extruded Solutions' production stemmed from internal scrap recycling and billets of remelted aluminium provided by external suppliers, according to Sapa's.

References 

Manufacturing companies of Norway
Aluminium companies of Norway
Companies based in Oslo
Manufacturing companies established in 1963
1963 establishments in Norway
Norsk Hydro